The common buttonquail (Turnix sylvaticus), also called Kurrichane buttonquail, small buttonquail, or Andalusian hemipode is a buttonquail, one of a small family of birds which resemble but are unrelated to the true of quails.

Description
The common buttonquail resembles the common quail. It has streaked sandy brown upperparts, buff underparts with black flank markings, and a plain face. In flight, a whitish wingbar contrasts with the grey wing. Sexes are similar, but immature birds are more spotted below. This tiny buttonquail is notoriously difficult to see.

Distribution and habitat
This species is resident from southern Spain and Africa through India and tropical Asia to Indonesia. It inhabits warm grasslands or scrub jungle and feeds on insects and seeds. This species avoids thick forest and hilly country, and lives by preference in cornfields and stretches of grassy plain though it may also be found in any type of low herbage and open scrub jungle.

Behaviour
It skulks and is flushed with difficulty, rising often close by one's feet. When flushed it flies low over the ground and soon settles again, after which it is very difficult to put up a second time. The female calls with a deep hoom-hoom-hoom and the male replies kek-kek-kek.

Breeding
The female initiates courtship and builds the ground nest. The male incubates the normally four speckled greyish eggs, and tends the young, which can run as soon as they are hatched. The nesting season is June to September. The nest is a slight pad of grass placed in a natural hollow in the ground where it is usually tucked away amongst the stems of a tuft of grass. Very occasionally the grass is bent over it in a sort of canopy.

Conservation
Widespread throughout its large range, the small buttonquail is evaluated as least concern on the IUCN Red List of Threatened Species. However, the nominate subspecies which is distributed in the Mediterranean region is critically endangered. It disappeared from most of its range during the 20th century and is currently only present in Morocco after Spain officially declared the extinction of the species in 2018. 
This makes it the first bird species to become extinct in Europe since the Great Auk in 1852. Its name is derived from Kaditshwene (rendered as 'Kurrichane') in Botswana.

In 2021, the IUCN declared the buttonquail extinct in Europe.

References

External links 

 
 Common buttonquail or Kurrichane buttonquail Species text in The Atlas of Southern African Birds
 
 
 
 
 

common buttonquail
Birds of Africa
Birds of South Asia
Birds of Southeast Asia
Birds of China
common buttonquail
common buttonquail